Wadie P. Deddeh (September 6, 1920 – August 27, 2019) was an American politician of Chaldean descent in the state of California. He served in the California State Assembly from 1967 to 1982, and in the California State Senate from 1982 to 1993. He is the first Iraqi-American elected official in the United States. Deddeh wrote the 1972 legislation that created the modern California Department of Transportation, handling the highway functions previously managed by a division of the California Department of Public Works. He died at the age of 98 on August 27, 2019.

References

1920 births
2019 deaths
Democratic Party California state senators
Democratic Party members of the California State Assembly
Iraqi emigrants to the United States
Politicians from Baghdad
20th-century American politicians
University of Baghdad alumni
University of Detroit Mercy alumni
California Department of Transportation
Chaldean Americans